Ariocarpus retusus is a species of cactus, from the genus Ariocarpus, found mainly in Mexico. It is one of the largest and fastest-growing species in this genus known for a slow rate of growth. Despite its slow growth, often taking ten years to reach flowering age, the retusus is a desirable cactus for cultivation, having attractive flowers and an unusual form for a cactus. It is also one of the most easily cultivated species in the genus.

References

External links

retusus
Cacti of Mexico
Endemic flora of Mexico
Garden plants of North America